Systaria is a genus of spiders in the family Miturgidae. It was first described in 1897 by Simon. , it contains 26 species.

Species
, the World Spider Catalog accepted the following extant species:

Systaria acuminata Dankittipakul & Singtripop, 2011 – Thailand, Indonesia
Systaria barkudensis (Gravely, 1931) – India
Systaria bifida Dankittipakul & Singtripop, 2011 – Thailand. Myanmar
Systaria bifidops Jäger, 2018 – Malaysia (Peninsula)
Systaria bohorokensis Deeleman-Reinhold, 2001 – Indonesia (Sumatra)
Systaria bregibec Jäger, 2018 – Cambodia
Systaria cervina (Simon, 1897) – Philippines
Systaria decidua Dankittipakul & Singtripop, 2011 – Thailand
Systaria deelemanae Dankittipakul & Singtripop, 2011 – Philippines
Systaria dentata Deeleman-Reinhold, 2001 – Indonesia (Sumatra)
Systaria drassiformis Simon, 1897 (type species) – Indonesia (Java)
Systaria elberti (Strand, 1913) – Indonesia (Lombok)
Systaria gedensis Simon, 1897 – Indonesia (Java)
Systaria hainanensis Zhang, Fu & Zhu, 2009 – China
Systaria insolita Dankittipakul & Singtripop, 2011 – Thailand
Systaria insulana (Rainbow, 1902) – Vanuatu
Systaria lanna Dankittipakul & Singtripop, 2011 – Thailand
Systaria lannops Jäger, 2018 – Thailand
Systaria leoi (Barrion & Litsinger, 1995) – Philippines
Systaria longinqua Jäger, 2018 – Laos
Systaria luangprabang Jäger, 2018 – Laos
Systaria mengla (Song & Zhu, 1994) – China
Systaria panay Jäger, 2018 – Philippines (Panay)
Systaria princesa Jäger, 2018 – Philippines (Palawan)
Systaria procera Jäger, 2018 – Cambodia
Systaria scapigera Dankittipakul & Singtripop, 2011 – New Guinea

References

Miturgidae
Araneomorphae genera
Spiders of Asia